Julian Schmidt may refer to:

 Heinrich Julian Schmidt (1818–1886), German journalist and historian of literature
 Julian Schmidt (BMX rider) (born 1994), German BMX rider